Valentine James Ozornwafor (born 1 June 1999) is a Nigerian professional footballer who plays as a central defender for Belgian club Sporting Charleroi.

Club career
Born in Port Harcourt, Ozonwafor joined Enyimba in 2017, after impressing while playing for a local side in a friendly against the club. He made his first team debut on 3 March, in a 0–0 away draw against Bendel Insurance, and played his second match on 17 March, in a draw at Sunshine Stars for the same scoreline.

Galatasaray
On 28 June 2019, it was announced that Ozornwafor signed a four year deal with Galatasaray, for a rumoured fee of €300,000.

UD Almería (loan)
On 22 August, he joined Spanish club UD Almería on loan for the 2019-20 season. Ozornwafor made his league debut on 6 October 2019, coming on as a second-half substitute for Jonathan in a 0–0 away draw against Deportivo de La Coruña.

Charleroi
In the statement made by the Galatasaray club on 21 August 2021, "An agreement has been reached with Charleroi for the temporary transfer of our professional football player Ozornwafor for one year. We wish our player success in his new club."

Sochaux (loan)
Following the loan, Charleroi acquired Ozornwafor's rights and loaned him to Sochaux in France on 8 July 2022. On 31 January 2023, the loan was terminated early.

International career
Ozornwafor represented Nigeria at under-20 level in the 2019 Africa U-20 Cup of Nations and in the 2019 FIFA U-20 World Cup. He was first called up to the full side in March 2019, for a friendly game against Seychelles and Egypt, but was only an unused substitute. He debuted with Nigeria in a 1–0 friendly loss to Cameroon on 4 June 2021.

Honours
Galatasaray
Süper Kupa: 2019

References

External links

1999 births
Living people
Nigerian footballers
Association football defenders
Enyimba F.C. players
Galatasaray S.K. footballers
UD Almería players
R. Charleroi S.C. players
FC Sochaux-Montbéliard players
Nigeria Professional Football League players
Süper Lig players
Segunda División players
Belgian Pro League players
Ligue 2 players
Championnat National 3 players
Nigeria youth international footballers
Nigeria under-20 international footballers
Nigeria international footballers
Nigerian expatriate footballers
Nigerian expatriate sportspeople in Turkey
Nigerian expatriate sportspeople in Spain
Nigerian expatriate sportspeople in Belgium
Nigerian expatriate sportspeople in France
Expatriate footballers in Turkey
Expatriate footballers in Spain
Expatriate footballers in Belgium
Expatriate footballers in France